Hell's Belles is a 1969 action film about two bikers who feud over a new motorcycle. The film was directed by Maury Dexter. It stars Jeremy Slate, Adam Roarke, and Jocelyn Lane and is a biker film, a subgenre of exploitation films. The film was shot around Tucson, Arizona.

The film was later released on DVD by MGM Home Entertainment as a double feature with The Wild Angels.

Plot
After winning a top motorbike in a race, biker Dan (Jeremy Slate) has it stolen by Tony (Michael Walker), a jealous competitor. Dan sets off to retrieve it and finds the bike is now in the hands of a motorcycle gang, led by Tampa (Adam Roarke), who has stolen it after beating up Tony. After failing to steal his bike back and receiving a beating himself from Tampa, Dan heads off in pursuit of the gang and his bike, this time reluctantly accompanied by leather miniskirted biker girl Cathy (Jocelyn Lane) who has been 'gifted' to Dan by Tampa in exchange for the bike.

Cast
Jeremy Slate as Dan
Adam Roarke as Tampa
Jocelyn Lane as Cathy
Angelique Pettyjohn as Cherry
William Lucking as Gippo
Michael Walker as Tony
Jerry Randell as Crazy John
Astrid Warner as Piper
Kristin Van Buren as Zelda

References

External links
 

1969 films
1960s action thriller films
American independent films
1969 independent films
Outlaw biker films
American action thriller films
Films scored by Les Baxter
1960s English-language films
Films directed by Maury Dexter
1960s American films